Rolf Viktor Smedmark (January 1, 1886 – April 29, 1951) was a Swedish athlete who competed in the 1912 Summer Olympics. He was eliminated in the semifinals of the 100 metres competition. In the standing high jump event he did not advance to the final and finished seventh. He died in his birthplace, Stockholm.

References

External links
profile

1886 births
1951 deaths
Swedish male high jumpers
Olympic athletes of Sweden
Athletes (track and field) at the 1912 Summer Olympics
Athletes from Stockholm
20th-century Swedish people